A Perfect Murder is a 1998 American crime thriller film directed by Andrew Davis and starring Michael Douglas, Gwyneth Paltrow, and Viggo Mortensen. It is a remake of Alfred Hitchcock's 1954 film Dial M for Murder, though the characters' names have been changed and much of the plot has been rewritten and altered from its original form. Loosely based on the play by Frederick Knott, the screenplay was written by Patrick Smith Kelly.

Plot
Steven Taylor is a Wall Street financier married to Emily, a much younger (over 20 years) translator for the United Nations. When his risky personal investments start unraveling, he intends to access Emily's personal fortune of $100 million to cover his losses. Meanwhile, Emily considers leaving Steven while enjoying an affair with painter David Shaw. Steven meets David at a gala, and asks to visit David's Brooklyn studio.

Steven arrives at David's studio the next day. He reveals that he knows about the affair, and used his influence to investigate David's criminal past as an ex-convict who cons rich women out of their money. Steven offers David $500,000 to murder Emily. When David responds that he and Emily are in love, Steven reminds him his next arrest will mean 15 years imprisonment.

Steven hides the door key from Emily's keyring outside the service entrance to their lavish Manhattan co-op apartment. David is to use the key, kill her, and make it look like a robbery. At his card game, Steven takes a break and uses his cellphone to make a call to an automated bank system, adding to his alibi, while using a second phone to call Emily. Emily answers in the kitchen and is attacked by a masked assailant, but stabs him in the neck with a meat thermometer.

Steven returns expecting Emily to be dead, but finds the assailant's body. He takes the key from the body and puts it back on Emily's keychain. Police arrive, led by Detective Karaman. They remove the assailant's mask and Karaman notices that Steven is surprisedthe body is not David's. Outside, David watches the body being removed from the building in a black bag and assumes it to be Emily.

Karaman requests that Steven and Emily come down to the station so Emily can provide a statement. With their lawyer in tow, she provides the statement and they learn the identity of the intruder. In the meantime, Karaman takes an urgent call in the room from his wife about their infant child; Emily recognizes the Arabic conversation and inquires afterwards in fluent Arabic about the health of his son. Surprised and charmed, Karaman explains the child is suffering from colic, and they exchange blessings for good health with a mutual smile as the others in the room look on in confusion.

Steven takes Emily to stay at her mother's. A sobbing David receives a call from Emily assuring him she is fine, and will be back soon. Steven realizes Emily has called David by hitting the redial button on the phone, and he then organizes a meet on a ferry, where they discuss the incident and next plans. Emily visits her coworker, Raquel, and they discuss what happened. Emily relates her suspicions about Steven and Raquel tries to assuage her fears by assuring her that Steven has his own money, and hers is protected by their prenuptial agreement. But Emily confides that they never had a prenup; Steven had offered one, and Emily had refused. Raquel immediately looks concerned, and Emily slowly realizes the inherent motive Steven may have for murdering her.

Emily uses her connections to speak to a federal regulator, learning of Steven's financial troubles. She then informs Karaman, who says that Steven was no longer a suspect as his alibi is solid, though there is the lingering concern that the dead assailant did not have keys of any kind on his body, not even for his own apartment. This strikes Emily as an important clue as her own keys did not work in her apartment door when she had first returned home after being away.

Still losing money, Steven receives a call from David, who plays an audio tape of the two discussing the plan to kill Emily. They agree to meet at a local deli, where David demands the full $500,000 or he will turn Steven in.

Emily decides to go to the apartment of the assailant, discovering that her key on her keyring unlocks his door. Emily confronts Steven with this and his financial problems. Steven responds with evidence of Emily's affair with David, including incriminating photographs, as well as telling her details about David's sordid past and accuses him of being a blackmailer conning her and threatening him. When he saw the dead body in their kitchen, he assumed it was David and took the key from his pocket so as not to implicate Emily. She is distraught after learning this new information but seems convinced of Steven's story; he has an answer for every question she poses and does not seem rattled, until Emily mentions how she wants to go to the police with the information. He is immediately on the defensive, and advises her not to say anything to the detectives as he has admittedly tampered with a homicide scene and is paying off a blackmailer. She agrees to keep silent, and tells Steven that her wedding ring is still at David's loft, so Steven offers to go retrieve it for her.

Steven then goes to David's loft with the cash, but finds a note with Emily's ring, directing him to a park. David's phone rings, and Steven answersit is a ticketing agent, confirming David's train to Montreal. Steven meets David in a park and swaps the money for the audio tape.

Reaching the train's private compartment, David opens the bathroom door; Steven lunges out and stabs him, taking David's gun and the money. A dying David laughs, revealing he mailed a copy of the tape to Emily via courier service. Steven rushes home and finds the mail still unopened. He hides the money, gun and audio tape in his safe before Emily enters the room.

Steven showers then dresses for dinner, but Emily suggests they stay in instead. As she heads out to pick up food, she mentions that they should have the locks changed since her key is missing. Steven checks the service entrance, finds the key he hid for David, and realizes that the attacker had put it back after unlocking the door. Emily suddenly appears, revealing that she knows everything now, having found the tape in the safe while he showered. When she turns to leave, Steven attacks her. A brief fight ensues, ending when Emily uses David's gun from the safe to shoot and kill Steven.

Karaman and his officers arrive. Emily plays David's tape for them, then tearfully explains how Steven threatened to kill her, she tried to flee, and he attacked her. Karaman replies, "What else could you do?" He and Emily exchange an Arabic blessing.

Cast

 Michael Douglas as Steven Taylor
 Gwyneth Paltrow as Emily Bradford Taylor
 Viggo Mortensen as David Shaw
 David Suchet as Detective Mohamed Karaman
 Sarita Choudhury as Raquel Martinez
 Constance Towers as Sandra Bradford
 Novella Nelson as Ambassador Alice Wills
 Michael P. Moran as Bobby Fain
 Gerry Becker as Roger Brill
 Will Lyman as Jason Gates

Comparisons to the original film

In Hitchcock's Dial M For Murder, the characters played by Ray Milland and Grace Kelly are depicted as living in a modest London flat, although it is implied that they are quite wealthy, as Milland's character, Tony Wendice, is a retired tennis champion. Michael Douglas and Gwyneth Paltrow's characters are also shown as an extremely wealthy couple.  Both Kelly and Paltrow's characters are shown as striking blondes.  Both films make use of the mystery of the fact that no key was found on the dead man when he was killed by both Kelly and Paltrow's characters, as both their husbands had removed them in an attempt to pin the crime on their wives.  Toward the beginning of Dial M For Murder, when Kelly and Robert Cummings are shown together in the Wendice flat, and Milland comes home, Kelly greets him with "There you are!" and kisses him.  Presumably in homage to the original film, Douglas's character greets Paltrow exactly the same way when she arrives home to their apartment at the beginning of A Perfect Murder.

Throughout the film, Emily carries an Hermès Kelly bag, named after Grace Kelly who was often photographed carrying the model of purse.

The title A Perfect Murder matches the translation that was made in some countries of Hitchcock's film, known in Italian as Il delitto perfetto and in Spanish as Crimen perfecto; in French it was Le crime était presque parfait.

Production
Principal photography began on October 14, 1997. Filming took place in & around New York City. The location of Steven & Emily's apartment was filmed at The Convent of The Sacred Heart building in Manhattan. The Bradford Mansion was filmed at the Salutation House in Long Island. Filming ended on January 13, 1998.

Alternate ending
An alternate ending exists and is presented, with optional commentary, on the original Blu-ray disc release. In this version, Steven comes back from finding the key replaced where he had hidden it and Emily confronts him in the kitchen rather than in their foyer. The scene plays out with the same dialogue, but Steven never physically attacks her. He still tells her that the only way she'll leave him is dead, and she shoots him. Steven then says "You won't get away with this" before dying and Emily purposely injures herself, making it look like self-defense.

Reception

Box office
A Perfect Murder opened in second place at the box office behind The Truman Show, grossing $16,615,704 during its first weekend. It ended up with a total worldwide gross of $128,038,368.

Critical response
A Perfect Murder received mixed reviews from critics: Stephen Holden of The New York Times called it a "skillfully plotted update of Frederick Knott's play". Owen Glelberman of Entertainment Weekly commented, " I’ve seen far worse thrillers than “A Perfect Murder,” but the movie is finally more competent than it is pleasurable. All that lingers from it is the color of money." Rita Kempley of The Washington Post noted, "The trouble is, we don't really much care about this philandering billionaire glamour puss, who seems perfectly capable of taking care of herself. We don't care about her husband or lover either. The story's most compelling character, an Arab American detective (the superb British actor David Suchet), becomes a minor player here. Nevertheless, like John Williams in the Hitchcock film, Suchet commits the film's only believable crime: He steals the show." Paul Clinton of CNN observed, "This production is stylishly mounted... Douglas is an excellent actor and a gifted producer. However, he should hang up his spurs when it comes to playing a romantic lead with women in their twenties."  Roger Ebert, who gave the film 3 stars out of 4, wrote "[It] works like a nasty little machine to keep us involved and disturbed; my attention never strayed". Meanwhile, James Berardinelli wrote that the film "has inexplicably managed to eliminate almost everything that was worthwhile about Dial M for Murder, leaving behind the nearly-unwatchable wreckage of a would-be '90s thriller." A Perfect Murder holds a 57% "Rotten" rating on Rotten Tomatoes from 53 reviews. The site's consensus states: "A slick little thriller that relies a bit too much on surprise events to generate suspense." It has a score of 50/100, based on 22 reviews ("mixed or average reviews") from Metacritic.

References

External links

 
 
 
 
 

1998 films
1990s English-language films
1998 crime thriller films
American films based on plays
Remakes of American films
American crime thriller films
Films about adultery in the United States
Films about con artists
Films about contract killing in the United States
Films directed by Andrew Davis
Films produced by Arnold Kopelson
Films scored by James Newton Howard
Films set in Brooklyn
Films set in Manhattan
Films shot in New York City
Warner Bros. films
Films produced by Peter MacGregor-Scott
1990s American films